Timo Bornemann (born 1 December 2000) is a German footballer who currently plays as a forward for Borussia Dortmund II.

Club career
Bornemann played youth football for ASV Tiefenbroich and SG Unterrath before signing with Fortuna Düsseldorf in 2015.

Career statistics

Club

Notes

References

2000 births
Living people
German footballers
Association football forwards
Regionalliga players
3. Liga players
Fortuna Düsseldorf II players
Borussia Dortmund II players
People from Ratingen
Sportspeople from Düsseldorf (region)
Footballers from North Rhine-Westphalia